Cleator Moor has had three passenger stations:

The original 1857 Cleator Moor station which became a goods station when it was replaced in 1866. Its 1866 replacement which went on to be known as Cleator Moor East, and the rival 1879 station which went on to be known as Cleator Moor West.

Cleator Moor East railway station was the second station built by the Whitehaven, Cleator and Egremont Railway in the growing industrial town of Cleator Moor, Cumbria, England.

History
The line was one of the fruits of the rapid industrialisation of West Cumberland in the second half of the nineteenth century. The original Cleator Moor station opened to passengers on 1 July 1857 on the line being developed from Moor Row to Rowrah.

Subsidence led the company to build a deviation line which curved round the west side of the original station and the growing settlement, in a similar manner to what it was forced to do at Eskett a few miles to the east. They built a passenger station on the deviation line - known locally as "The Bowthorn Line" - which would go on to be called Cleator Moor East.

When the deviation line and station opened in 1866 the original station was closed to passengers and became "Cleator Moor Goods Depot." It remained open for goods traffic until the 1950s.

Services
Whilst some Whitehaven, Cleator and Egremont Railway (WCER) mineral, goods and passenger traffic to and from Rowrah passed north along the line to Marron Junction, the greater part arrived and left southwards towards Moor Row and therefore passed through Cleator Moor. Mineral traffic was also generated locally from the quarries and mines such as the Iron Works within sight of the station.

In 1922 seven all stations passenger trains called at Cleator Moor East in each direction, with an extra on Whitehaven Market Day. Four were Rowrah to Whitehaven services, the other three plied a long, circuitous route between Workington Main and Whitehaven via Camerton, Marron Junction, Ullock, Rowrah and Moor Row.

Cleator Moor East station's owning Whitehaven, Cleator and Egremont company was taken over by the LNWR and Furness Railway in 1879 as a Joint Line, whereafter the section through the station was usually worked by the LNWR.

Goods traffic typically consisted of a two daily turns Up and Down.

Mineral traffic was the dominant flow, though this was subject to considerable fluctuation with trade cycles. Stations and signalling along the line south of Rowrah were changed during the Joint regime to conform to Furness Railway standards.

Rundown and closure
The station closed on 13 April 1931 when normal passenger traffic ended along the line, though workmen's trains were reinstated in March 1940, only to be withdrawn a month later. An enthusiasts' special ran through on 5 September 1954. After scant occasional use the line northwards from Rowrah was abandoned in 1960 and subsequently lifted.

The line southwards from Rowrah through Cleator Moor East lead a charmed life, continuing with a limestone flow from a quarry at Rowrah until 1978, after which all traffic ceased and the tracks were lifted.

Afterlife
By 2013 the station appeared to have been demolished and some of the trackbed had become a Public Open Space.

See also

 Furness Railway
 Cleator and Workington Junction Railway

References

Sources

Further reading

External links
Map of the line with photos, via RAILSCOT
The station on overlain OS maps surveyed from 1898, via National Library of Scotland
All three closed stations on a 1948 OS Map, via npe maps
The station, via Rail Map Online
Cleator Moor East station and deviation line, via railwaycodes
The railways of Cumbria, via Cumbrian Railways Association
Photos of Cumbrian railways, via Cumbrian Railways Association
The railways of Cumbria, via Railways_of_Cumbria
Cumbrian Industrial History, via Cumbria Industrial History Society
The line's and station's Engineer's Line References, via railwaycodes.org.uk
Furness Railtour using many West Cumberland lines 5 September 1954, via sixbellsjunction
A video tour-de-force of the region's closed lines, via cumbriafilmarchive
1882 RCH Diagram showing the station, see page 173 of the pdf, via google
Haematite, via earthminerals

Disused railway stations in Cumbria
Railway stations in Great Britain opened in 1866
Railway stations in Great Britain closed in 1931
Cleator Moor